The German journal Berlin Rom Tokio: Monatsschrift für die Vertiefung der kulturellen Beziehungen der Völker des weltpolitischen Dreiecks (English: Berlin Rome Tokyo: Monthly Journal for the Deepening of Cultural Relations between the Peoples of the World-Political Triangle) was a periodical published during the National Socialist era in Berlin, where it was printed by Verlag Ernst Steiniger from Volume 1 (1939) Issue 1 until its discontinuation with Volume 6 (1944) Issue 5. It was edited by German foreign minister Joachim von Ribbentrop.

The strongly propaganda-oriented monthly was published by Paul Carell of the Berlin Foreign Office after Italy's accession (1937) to the Anti-Comintern Pact of 1936. As a lavishly designed, bilingual magazine (German/Italian) in four-colour print, it was intended to accompany and document the close cooperation between these three states.

Notes

References

Further reading
 Oskar Schneider-Kynast. (1940). Drei Mächte Pakt, Berlin – Rom – Tokio. Nationale Verlagsgesellschaft W. Conrad & Co., Leipzig.
 Peter Longerich. (1987). Propagandisten im Krieg. Die Presseabteilung des Auswärtigen Amtes unter Ribbentrop (Studien zur Zeitgeschichte. Bd. 33), Oldenbourg Verlag, München, ISBN 3-486-54111-0.
 Paul W. Frey. (1997). Faschistische Fernostpolitik. Italien, China und die Entstehung des weltpolitischen Dreieckes Rom-Berlin-Tokio (Italien in Geschichte und Gegenwart.  Bd. 7), Peter Lang Verlag, Frankfurt am Main/New York.

1944 disestablishments in Germany
1939 establishments in Germany
Cultural magazines published in Germany
Defunct political magazines published in Germany
Magazines disestablished in 1944
Magazines established in 1939
Magazines published in Berlin
Monthly magazines published in Germany
Former state media
Propaganda newspapers and magazines
Fascist newspapers and magazines